Ib Nørholm (24 January 1931 in Søborg, Gladsaxe Municipality – 10 June 2019) was a Danish composer and organist.

Life and career
Nørholm studied with Vagn Holmboe at the Royal Danish Academy of Music, where he later taught (from 1973), becoming a professor in 1981. Among the honours Nørholm has received are the Gaudeamus International Composers Award in 1964, the Carl Nielsen Prize in 1971 and a knighthood in 1981.

Initially, Nørholm's music was very much in the tradition of Carl Nielsen, as exemplified by his first symphony (1956-8). In the 1960s, however, Nørholm began to explore the possibilities of serialism and graphic scores, having been deeply impressed by his experiences of the music of Karlheinz Stockhausen, Pierre Boulez, and others at the ISCM in Cologne.
Later still his music took on a more economical approach, often characterised by the term 'new simplicity'.

Compositions by Nørholm include the opera The Young Park (1969–70), Symphony No. 3 (1973), sonatas for accordion (1967) and guitar (1976), Idylles d'Apocalypse for organ and orchestra (1980), Symphony No. 5 'The Elements' (1980), Immanence for solo flute (1983), Aspects of Sand and Simplicity for string orchestra (1987), a symphonic fantasy Hearing Andersen (1987), and the choral work Sjaelfuld Sommer (1997). The opera Invitation til Skafottet ("Invitation to a Beheading") (1965) was commissioned by the Danish Broadcasting Corporation. In all Nørholm has written twelve symphonies. His second symphony, commissioned by the Danish National Symphony Orchestra is subtitled Isola Bella, and the fourth symphony is subtitled Moderskabelsen ("Mother Creation"). The première of his twelfth symphony, Virkeligheder on texts by Thorkild Bjørnvig, Lene Henningsen and Inger Christensen, took place in Odense on 28 April 2011.

In addition to his activities as a composer, Nørholm was a prolific music critic and choral conductor. He died on 10 June 2019, aged 88.

Selected works

Orchestral music
Thirteen symphonies (1956–58, 1968–71, 1973, 1978–79, 1980–81, 1981, 1982, 1990, 1990, 1998, 2008, 2009, 2013)
Concerto for violin and orchestra (1974)
Concerto for cello and orchestra (1989)

Chamber music
Mosaic: Recitative Fragments, op. 15 (1959) for flute, violin, viola and cello
Varianter, op. 19 (1959) for violin and piano
Præludium til min vintermorgen (Prelude to my Winter Morning), op. 52 (1971) for flute, violin, viola, cello and piano
Kontrast-Kontinuum, op. 70 (1977) for flute quartet
Så at sige (So to Say), op. 74 (1978) for flute and percussion
Essai prismatique, op. 77 (1979) for violin, cello and piano
Before Silence, op. 83 (1980) for flute trio
Den ortodokse drøm (The Orthodox Dream), op. 92 (1984) for flute, cello and harpsichord
Medusa's Shadow, op. 105 (1987) for flute, guitar, viola and cello
Saxophone Quartet (1992)
Nu og Da (2000–01) for voices and string quartet
Jubilate Deo in Primavere (2005) for flute, saxophone and percussion

Songs
3 Songs, Op. 3b  : No. 1 Critique Of Gold No. 2 The Condemned Speak Of Their Country No. 3 Pictures, Pictures, Pictures

Solo instrumental music
Sonata No. 1, op. 69 (1976) for guitar
Turbulens-Laminar, op. 93 (1984) for piano
Sonata No. 2, op. 110 (1989) for guitar
A Song of Breath and Wings (2002) for clarinet

References

External links
Edition S website, Ib Nørholm

1931 births
2019 deaths
Danish classical composers
Danish male classical composers
20th-century classical composers
21st-century classical composers
Gaudeamus Composition Competition prize-winners
People from Gladsaxe Municipality
Royal Danish Academy of Music alumni
Danish classical organists
Male classical organists
Pupils of Vagn Holmboe
21st-century organists
20th-century Danish male musicians
21st-century male musicians